Wolfgang Baer (1944-2021) was a German-born theoretical physicist, living in the United States since 1953. His research has culminated on the focus of cognitive brain functions, the physics of consciousness, real intelligence, and pursuing/promoting research which focuses on the extension of cognitive brain capability beyond its normal limits

Early life and education 

Baer immigrated to the US from Germany in 1953, studied physics at the University of Michigan and received his Ph.D. in physics at the University of California; in 1972, Baer wrote a controversial thesis which attempted to incorporate the 1st-person subjective observer into a standard quantum experiment. Baer worked at Ford Aerospace as a mission analyst for meteorological and communication satellites before becoming a systems and software developer in Silicon Valley. He started several companies and built unmanned aerial vehicle mission control systems, based upon his work in the physics of consciousness, as Associate Professor at the Naval Postgraduate School, where he was best recognized for his leadership in the development of Perspective View Nascent Technology (PVNT).

Academic career and research 
Dr. Baer is the primary author of the PVNT software; the software utilizes high-resolution video at low-cost, in order to interpret data on the battlefield, according to research published by the U.S. Defense Technical Information Center.

He is currently the research director at Nascent System Incorporated where he is expanding his original Ph.D. thesis in developing 1st-person physics theories that include the subjective element on an equal footing with standard physical world views supported by classic physics and quantum Theory.

He is best known for his Conscious Action Theory (CAT), which provides a logical unification between the spirit and the material, by identifying reality as an event that processes personal experiences into explanatory memories, from which personal experiences are regenerated in a never-ending cycle of activity. His observer first approach to physics reverses the nearly one-thousand-year tradition of defining the nature and laws of an observe-independent universe and then attempt to discover how conscious beings evolved. Instead Baer starts with a model of the conscious observer and describes the activities such a being executes to build and test any theory of reality such an observer may develop. As such he incorporates the lesson from Eddington's Fish Story, which suggests that the most fundamental laws of physics will ultimately turn out to be the mental framework of methodologies and tools by which we seek to know and understand the world.

Practical applications of Baer's observer first approach is to recognize ‘Reality’ as a Wittgenstein use symbol, whose meaning is defined not by some external thing we see, but by its use in whatever system of beliefs we conscious beings develop to understand and manipulate the sensation we experiences. Theories of Reality do not attempt to discover the Nature of a fixed thing out there. Instead, they limit the way we experience and explain our experiences and they evolve as our mental methodologies and tools evolve. CAT therefore addresses the methodologies by which theories and models are developed. Applying such methodologies allows us to expand quantum theory to include the creation and destruction of the Hilbert space in which quantum oscillations propagate. Cat methodologies also encourage the development of a mental training system that enhance the way we see and interpret what we see.

The fundamental dynamic principles of CAT are that conscious systems are activities which attempt to 1) increase the amount of action they experience in their lifetimes while 2) reducing the internal forces to a minimum. CAT methodologies lead to a new economic theory of value by identifying action with profit but also considering the value of profit in subjective stress and strain required to realize those profits

Publications 

 Baer W. (1972) “The Crystal Spectra of Pm in CaCl “ Phd Thesis in Physics, University of California Berkeley, 
 Baer, Wolfgang (2006) Amazing Light-Visions for Discovery, Journal of Consciousness Studies,13, No.1-2,2006, pp. 177–183
 Baer W. (2010a) “Introduction to the Physics of Consciousness”, Journal of Consciousness Studies, 17, No. 3–4, 2010, pp. 165–91
 Baer W. (2010b) “Theoretical Discussion for Quantum Computation in Biological Systems”, SPIE Defense & Security Symposium, 5–9 April 2010 in Orlando, Florida, USA. Quantum Information and Computation VIII, Paper #7702-31 
 Baer W. (2011) "Cognitive Operations in the First-person Perspective. Part1:The 1st Person Laboratory", Quantum Biosystems. 3(2)26-44 http://www.quantumbiosystems.org/admin/files/Baer%20QBS%203%282%29%2026-44.pdf
 Baer W. (2012) "The Cognitive Force in the Hierarchy of the Quantum Brain", Toward  a Science of Consciousness Abstract, Tucson April 9–12 
 Baer, W., Mitterauer, B., (2013), Vorschlag zur näheren Anpassen der deutschen schriftlichen Sprache an die wissenschaftlichen Fortschritte des letzten Jahrhunderts
 Baer W.(2013)  "Chapter 4:  A Conceptual Framework to Embed Conscious Experience in Physical Processes" from The Unity of Mind, Brain and World: Current Perspectives on a Science of Consciousness, Cambridge University Press
 Baer W., (2014) “Chapter 1: The physical Foundation of Consciousness“ from Mind, Brain, and Cosmos, edited by Deepak Chopra, First Nook Edition: Nov 2013, available in Kindle Edition August 2014.
 Baer, W. (2014) “Force of Consciousness in Mass Charge Interactions” , Cosmos and History: The Journal of Natural and Social Philosophy, Vol 10, No 1 (2014), URL; http://www.cosmosandhistory.org/index.php/journal/article/view/421
 Housel T. J., Baer W., Mun J., (2015) “A New Theory of Value: The New Invisible Hand of Altruism” from Intellectual Capital in Organizations, edited by Patricia Ordoñez de Pablos and Leif Edvinsson, Routledge  Publisher link: https://www.routledge.com/Intellectual-Capital-in-Organizations-Non-Financial-Reports-and-Accounts/de-Pablos-Edvinsson/p/book/9780415737821
Baer W., (2015) Photons as Observer Transitions in the Event Oriented World View, In Proceedings of SPIE Volume 9570, The Nature of Light What are Photons? VI Editors: C. Roychoudhuri, Al F. Kracklauer, H De Raedt,  10-13 Aug. 2015, San Diego CA
 Baer, W. (2015) "Independent verification of psychophysical interactions with a double-slit interference pattern", Physics Essays Volume 28: Pages 47–54. 
 Baer W., (2015) Pan-psychic Consciousness in Mass-Charge Interactions, Interalia Magazine, May 2015, http://www.interaliamag.org/articles/pan-psychic-consciousness-in-mass-charge-interactions/
 Baer W., (2015) On the Necessity of Including the Observer in Physical Theory, Cosmos and History: The Journal of Natural and Social Philosophy, vol. 11, no. 2, 2015: URL http://www.cosmosandhistory.org/index.php/journal/article/viewFile/492/825
 Baer W., (2016) Mass Charge Interactions for Visualizing the Quantum Field. In: “Unified Field Mechanics” Editors R. Amoroso, L. Kauffman, P. Rowlands, World Scientific (2016) pp 312–320, Proceedings of the IXth Vigier Conference, Morgan State University, 16–19 November 2014 Baltimore MD, USA
 Baer W., (2017) “ Does the Rose-tinted Glassed Effect in Contemporary Physics Prevent us from Explaining Consciousness?” Journal of Consciousness Studies Oll. 24, No 7-8 (2017)
 Baer W., (2017) "You are the Universe", Journal of Consciousness Studies, Vol. 24 No.3-4 March/April 2017, p223
 Baer W., (2018) “Introduction to Cognitive Action Theory”, J. Phys.: Conf. Ser. 1251 012008, 
 Baer W. (2020) Conscious Action Theory: an introduction to the event oriented world view, Routledge Press,  (hbk)
 Baer W. (2020) “The Grand Challenge For Science”, Interalia Magazine (July 2020) https://www.interaliamag.org/articles/wolfgang-baer-the-grand-challenge-for-science/

References 

1944 births
Living people
American people of German descent
University of Michigan alumni
University of California alumni
Naval Postgraduate School faculty
Theoretical physicists